The Unknown Soldier is a 2017 Finnish independent war drama film, an adaptation of the bestselling 1954 Finnish classic novel of the same name by Väinö Linna, literature considered part of the national legacy. Directed by Aku Louhimies, it is the first one based on the novel's manuscript version,  ("the war novel"). Previously adapted in 1955 and 1985, the World War II film is presented from the point of view of a machine gun company of the Finnish Army during the Continuation War between Finland and the Soviet Union from 1941 to 1944. It was the most expensive Finnish motion picture at its release with a budget of €7 million.

The film opened to mixed reviews domestically on 27 October 2017, part of the official 100th anniversary of Finnish independence program, breaking the opening weekend record for a local-language film. The international premier was on 23 November 2017 at the Tallinn Black Nights Film Festival, followed by Ireland, Sweden, Iceland and Norway. The film was described by critics as gritty, forlorn, honest and realistic as well as a pacifist piece confronting less pleasant sides of Finnish history. The film won four Jussi Awards for Best Actor (Aho), along with Best Editing, Best Makeup and Hairstyling, and Best Sound Editing from a total of eleven nominations. With a €13.5 million domestic gross at the 2017 box office, it was the most successful film of the year in Finnish cinema.

Synopsis

Setting and characters 
The film's setting is based on the unit Väinö Linna served in during the Continuation War, Infantry Regiment 8. It follows a fictional Finnish Army machine gun company in the Karelian front from mobilisation in 1941 to armistice in 1944.  The soldiers of the company are sympathetic but realistic portraits of men from all over Finland with widely varying backgrounds. Their attitude is relaxed, disrespectful of formalities, and business-like, even childish and jolly, throughout the story despite the war and the losses the company suffers. The film occasionally shifts to the homefront, showing for example Kariluoto marrying his fiancée at Helsinki Cathedral and Antero Rokka visiting his wife Lyyti and children at their farm on the Karelian Isthmus.

Plot 

The machine gun company is deployed in June 1941 from their barracks to the staging area to prepare for the invasion of the Soviet Union. The company's first attack is over a swamp on Soviet positions. Following a series of battles, the soldiers advance into East Karelia and cross the old border lost during the Winter War. In October 1941, they interact with the locals while positioned in the captured and pillaged city of Petrozavodsk. The company is ordered to defend against a Soviet winter attack along the Svir river. Lahtinen is killed during a Soviet breakthrough, but Rokka halts a flanking 50-strong enemy unit by ambushing them with a Suomi KP/-31 submachine gun from high ground. The film follows the trench warfare period of the war from 1942 to 1943. The soldiers drink kilju (a home-made sugar wine) until intoxication during Commander-in-Chief Field Marshal Carl Gustaf Emil Mannerheim's birthday celebrations, a new recruit is killed by a sniper and replacements reinforce the company.

The Soviet Vyborg–Petrozavodsk Offensive of summer 1944 forces the Finnish Army to start a withdrawal from the conquered area and to stall the Soviet advance with counter-attacks. Hietanen is first wounded by artillery and later dies when his ambulance is attacked. In the subsequent fighting, the company suffers large numbers of casualties, including Captain Kariluoto, and abandons its machine guns during a retreat from a hopeless defence. Shortly afterwards, the company must hold the line against another Soviet attack. Koskela is killed while disabling a Soviet tank with a satchel charge. After the last counter-attack by the Finns, the war ends in a ceasefire in September 1944. The soldiers rise from their defensive fighting positions after the final Soviet artillery barrage stops and they listen to the first radio announcements on the eventual Moscow Armistice. The film closes with a montage of the impacts of the war and actual war-time footage.

Cast

 Eero Aho as Antero "Antti" Rokka, a pragmatic veteran corporal of the Winter War and originally a farmer from the Karelian Isthmus, who came to the war "to kill and not to be killed" and does not believe in military discipline. According to the newspaper Helsingin Sanomat, Aho's casting came as a surprise considering he had mostly played villains or tormented characters in the past.
 Johannes Holopainen as Jorma Kariluoto, an idealistic 2nd lieutenant, later lieutenant and captain.
 Jussi Vatanen as Vilho "Ville" Johannes Koskela, platoon leader as 2nd lieutenant and later lieutenant. Koskela is described as the archetypal Finnish role model: quiet, upstanding and modest.
 Aku Hirviniemi as corporal, later sergeant Urho Hietanen, the platoon jokester from Finland Proper.
 Severi Saarinen as Lehto, an aggressive and irritable corporal who hates weakness. 
 Hannes Suominen as Vanhala, a Tavastian private, later lance corporal and corporal who does not take the war seriously and favours listening to gramophone records of Soviet songs, such as "Kalinka".
 Paula Vesala as Lyyti, Rokka's wife who stays behind at the Karelian Isthmus to take care of the farm and their children. The character did not appear in previous film adaptations, but has been regarded as a welcome balance to the focus on the frontline.
 Samuli Vauramo as Lammio, a disciplined platoon leader who is promoted to captain and company commander after the first battle. Lammio is portrayed as more humane than the caricatures of previous versions.
 Joonas Saartamo as Yrjö Lahtinen, a communist relic from the Finnish Civil War.
 Arttu Kapulainen as private Susi ("Suen Tassu"), Rokka's quiet neighbour and closest friend from the Karelian Isthmus who follows him everywhere.
 Andrei Alén as Rahikainen, an unempathetic private who takes advantage of the war environment.
 Eino Heiskanen as Riitaoja, a timid and fearful soldier who is mostly a burden to the platoon.
 Kimi Vilkkula as Sihvonen, a clumsy but an adept soldier of the platoon.
 Juho Milonoff as Aarne Honkajoki, a reservist private who reinforces the company.
 Eemeli Louhimies as Asumaniemi, a cocky and naiive 19-year-old private who reinforces the company. 
 Matti Ristinen as Sarastie, major and commander of the battalion.

Production

Development 
Development of The Unknown Soldier began in September 2014 when the Finnish Film Foundation granted 30,000 euros to Aku Louhimies' production company and his plan to base the film on the original novel's manuscript version  ("the war novel"), released in 2010. According to Louhimies, his vision for the film was to make a modern version of the classic, similar to new versions of Macbeth or Othello, and bring the original novel to "the audience of today" and within the reach of the younger generation—who hardly knew Väinö Linna's novel or the first film at the time. Louhimies compared the screenplay to Thin Red Line which both selectively feature storylines from the source material.

With a budget of 7 million euros, The Unknown Soldier became the most expensive film ever made in Finland or in the Finnish language. Producers pitched the film to investors with the script alone and funding for the film was fully secured in August 2015 with €5 million of the financing coming from private investors, such as video game company Supercell, banking group LähiTapiola and foundations. Additionally €1 million came from the Finnish Film Foundation and €1 million from the national broadcaster Yle. The film was produced by the Finnish Elokuvaosakeyhtiö Suomi 2017 with the Icelandic Kvikmyndafélag Íslands and Belgian Scope Pictures as co-producers. Reportedly, Rafale International, a defense aviation manufacturer whose Dassault Rafale fighter was one of the aircraft in consideration to replace the Finnish Air Force's fleet of F/A-18 Hornets, was the film's main partner.

Filming 

Filming commenced on 6 June 2016 and was shot in 80 days with over 3,000 extras and the support of the Finnish Defence Forces at locations around Finland, such as Suomenlinna fortress and North Karelia wilderness with most of the battle scenes done at Karelia Brigade training area. Initially, over 14,000 people volunteered as extras. On 29 June 2016, the film set a Guinness World Record when Duncan Capp of IFX International Special Effects detonated the most high explosives in a single film take, 70.54 kg of TNT equivalent. By day 72 of filming, 458 hours of footage had been captured with a production team of 120 people. Benjamin Mercer edited the film releases as well as the five-part television release with the Final Cut Pro X application.

The cast, of whom some had prior conscript military experience, went through boot camp training arranged by the auxiliary National Defence Training Association on wilderness skills, how to keep warm during winter and how to move with cross-country skis in a forest. Louhimies wanted "people to feel and understand how it is and feel to be at war". The cast slept at scene locations in stove-warmed military tents, mimicking an actual war-time unit. To imbue realism into the scenes, the film was shot without artificial lighting, using whatever conditions the crew had.

Music 
The soundtrack of the film was composed by Lasse Enersen (with whom Louhimies had cooperated before) and recorded with the Lahti Symphony Orchestra at Sibelius Hall. Louhimies wanted the music to display "soul and fragility" while Enersen described it as "simple, stark, sometimes raw and ugly" and left out themes of heroism or victory from the score. Louhimies considered it important that the music was produced in Finland in alignment with the 100th year of Finnish independence. Enersen visited locations of the film during filming to talk with actors, find inspiration and to observe. He decided to use a synthesizer and a Hardanger fiddle, a traditional Norwegian instrument, to complement the orchestra's music. Caoimhín Ó Raghallaigh, an Irish fiddler, performed the Hardanger on the score. On 15 September 2017, the Finnish pop rock band Haloo Helsinki! released the song "Tuntematon" ("Unknown"), thematically tied to the film through its lyrics and music video. The music video was directed by Aku Louhimies and Aleksi Koskinen.

Themes 

The film was described as honestly confronting the less pleasant aspects of Finnish history, such as the nature of the war as Finnish aggression, military cooperation with Nazi Germany, and Adolf Hitler's secret visit to celebrate Field Marshal Mannerheim's 75th birthday in June 1942. For example, military historian Lasse Laaksonen said that the film's positive aspect is that it allows Finns to learn about their history. Likewise, the film was described as a gritty, forlorn, pacifist and realistic outlook on the Continuation War. Director Louhimies commented that he intended to highlight the individuals taking part in war instead of glorifying conflict and stay true to Väinö Linna's views. Allusions were drawn from the film's patriotic nature to contemporary foreign policy of Russia, tensions in the Baltic region and Mannerheim's description of Russia as Finland's “hereditary enemy from the East”. However, the film was described as using Russian actors, such as Diana Pozharskaya playing Vera in the conquered Petrozavodsk, to humanize the war.

Release 
The film's release was tied to the centenary of Finnish independence. It premiered in Finland on 27 October 2017 at 140 locations with an age rating of 16 and distributed by SF Studios. German independent film distributor Beta Cinema purchased the international sales rights for the movie. The Unknown Soldier was featured at the American Film Market in November 2017, and during the same month SF Studios acquired distribution rights for Sweden, Norway and Denmark and Arrow Films the rights for the United Kingdom and Ireland. The international premier of the film was at the Tallinn Black Nights Film Festival in Estonia on 23 November 2017. It opened at the Subtitle film festival in Ireland on 25 November 2017, in Sweden on 6 December 2017, in Iceland on 25 January 2018 and in Norway on 9 February 2018. While the running time of the film's original domestic theatre release was 179 minutes, an international version was cut to 133 minutes.

Reception

Box office 
In Finland, The Unknown Soldier grossed €3.0 million during its previews and opening weekend. It broke the record for the biggest opening weekend for a Finnish-language film and settled overall third after Star Wars: The Force Awakens and Spectre. It was the highest-grossing film of 2017 in Finnish cinema with €13.5 million.

Critical response 
The film received an average rating of 3.67 out of 5 in Finland according to a review aggregation article by the newspaper Aamulehti. Marko Ahonen from the newspaper Keskisuomalainen appraised The Unknown Soldier with five out of five, describing it as "an impressive pacifist war film" where the reality of combat is forlorn and unpleasant. He criticised the mixing of spoken dialogue, which sometimes was difficult to understand. Hufvudstadsbladet's Krister Uggeldahl called it "as traditional as respectful" and "a movie that breathes and lives (even when death is harvesting its victims), but at no stage apologizes" and gave it four out of five while thanking the actors' complete work. Markus Määttänen from Aamulehti likewise put the movie at four out of five and compared it to the poetic war experience of Thin Red Line, but disparaged how some characters, Lehto in particular, were diminished compared to previous film adaptations.  Juho Rissanen and Taneli Topelius of Finnish tabloids Iltalehti and Ilta-Sanomat, gave the film a full five out of five. Rissanen called it a masterpiece and "a film the 100 year old Finland truly deserves" and that the "psychological effect of war on men is now presented more visibly than before" while Topelius praised the portrayal of the homefront and the inclusion of women in the film, with both of them calling the film dark, honest and gritty.

Conversely, Juho Typpö from Helsingin Sanomat gave the film two stars out of five, arguing that the film failed to justify its existence because it was too similar to the novel's previous film adaptations. According to Typpö, the film was not bold enough, and instead followed conventional depictions of masculinity in Finnish cinema and was a safe, risk-free attempt to please everyone under Finland's 100 year celebrations. He also criticized that the film didn't take a stand against the rise of far right groups in Finland.

In Sweden, The Unknown Soldier received an average rating of 3.2 out of 5 according to the  review aggregator website. Björn Jansson from Sveriges Radio said the film is "a good depiction of the war's meaninglessness and insecurity" but that it is difficult to get along with its "futility, emptiness and waiting in muddy trenches", rating it three out of five.  Johan Croneman of Dagens Nyheter said the film was powerful and sad at the same time, but remarked that "[u]nfortunately, we cannot see the 3-hour original version in Swedish cinemas, instead, the 47-minute cut-off international release, and it's a rumphap that the film is suffering from. Several shades have been lost, it is quite obvious even if you did not see the original." Croneman put the film at four out of five. Jens Peterson of the tabloid Aftonbladet rated the film at three out of five and said that it "is well-told and strong, but not as original today."

Sigurd Vik from the Norwegian radio channel NRK P3 appraised the film with four out of six. He said that the film's chronicle-type screenplay "sometimes becomes a bit stiff and unobtrusive", but concluded that the film is an "interesting piece of war history" and a "raw and realistic infantry movie." Britt Sørensen of the newspaper Bergens Tidende commented that The Unknown Soldier is a film for those "who are particularly interested in war films and war history, or history in general. But it also has moments of cinematic beauty and profound humanity." She rated it at four out of six.

Accolades

TV Mini-Series (2018-2019) 
Extended footage from the 2017 Tuntematon sotilas film was edited into a five part TV series totaling 4 hours and 30 minutes. The TV series premiered on December 30, 2018.

See also 

 Finnish literature
 Finnish military ranks
 Finland–Russia relations
 Foreign relations of Russia
 Historiography in the Soviet Union
 List of anti-war films
 Military history of Finland during World War II

Other Finnish World War II films

 Ambush (1999 film)
 Beyond the Front Line
 The Boys (1962 Finnish film)
 The Interrogation (film)
 Tali-Ihantala 1944
 The Winter War (film)

References

External links 

 
 
 

2017 films
2010s historical films
2017 war drama films
Continuation War
Films directed by Aku Louhimies
Films based on works by Väinö Linna
Films based on military novels
Films based on Finnish novels
Films set in 1941
Films set in 1942
Films set in 1943
Films set in 1944
Films set in Finland
Films set in Helsinki
Films set in the Soviet Union
Films shot in Finland
2010s Finnish-language films
2017 independent films
Finnish war drama films
Anti-war films about World War II
Eastern Front of World War II films
2017 drama films
Finnish World War II films